Caloptilia fera is a moth of the family Gracillariidae. It is known from Kenya and Nigeria.

The larvae feed on Vigna unguiculata. They probably mine the leaves of their host plant.

References

fera
Moths described in 1989
Moths of Africa